Pareiorhaphis proskynita is a species of catfish in the family Loricariidae. It is native to South America, where it occurs in the Piracicaba River basin in Brazil. It is typically found in shallow blackwater streams with fast-flowing water and iron-rich rocky substrates covered in algae and periphyton, with juveniles occurring in areas with slower water flow. It is known to occur alongside members of the genera Hoplias and Oligosarcus in slower-flowing pools. The species reaches 9.6 cm (3.8 inches) in standard length, feeds primarily on filamentous algae, and is believed to be a facultative air-breather. Its specific name, proskynita, is derived from Greek and means "pilgrim", referring to pilgrimages associated with the region in which the species occurs.

References 

Loricariidae
Fish described in 2012
Catfish of South America
Freshwater fish of Brazil